Robert Elwell (fl. 1421) of Wells, Somerset, was an English politician.

Family
Elwell was probably the brother of another Wells MP, Hildebrand Elwell. Robert Elwell married twice. His first wife, Mary, died around 1421. His second wife, Alice, was the widow of another Wells MP, John Russell.

Career
He was a Member (MP) of the Parliament of England for Wells in December 1421.

References

Year of birth missing
Year of death missing
English MPs December 1421
People from Wells, Somerset